Cuervo is an unincorporated community in Guadalupe County, New Mexico, United States. Cuervo had a post office until September 10, 2011; it still has its own ZIP code, 88417. The community is nearly a ghost town now, having been split by the construction of I-40; but there is still a small church and a gas station.

Cuervo was founded in 1901, and a post office was opened there in 1902, although records indicate that there was a settlement there prior to 1901. It began as a supply center for ranches in the area; by 1926, it had become a stop on Route 66 for travellers. The 1940 census recorded a population of 128, although by that time there were "few gas stations, groceries, no café, garage or other tourist accommodations." By 2011 the shell of an old stone schoolhouse and a stone church were still standing

Cuervo consists of four streets south of I-40 and two streets north of the interstate. Nearly all of the structures in the community are abandoned and very deteriorated. The town began in 1901 when the railroad came thorough. The town started to grow when the surrounding land was opened to cattle ranching in 1910. Then Route 66 came, and the town's population peaked in the 1940s at over 300. There are two homes in the community that appear updated and inhabited, along with one auto repair business. The community's long-abandoned school building and church appear to be undergoing restoration.

As of 2022, access to the ghost town from I-40 has been inhibited by ongoing redevelopment of the motorway by the New Mexico Department of Transportation.

Gallery

References

External links
History and photos *

Unincorporated communities in Guadalupe County, New Mexico
Unincorporated communities in New Mexico
Ghost towns in New Mexico